Ranvijay Singh Yadav is an Indian politician. He was elected to the Bihar Legislative Assembly from Bakhtiarpur (Vidhan Sabha constituency) as the 2015 Member of Bihar Legislative Assembly as a member of the Bharatiya Janata Party.

References
 
 Bakhtiarpur Election and Results 2018, Candidate list, Winner, Runner-up, Current MLA and Previous MLAs
 Bakhtiarpur Assembly Election Results 2015, Candidate List, Constituency Map

Bihar MLAs 2015–2020
People from Patna
1977 births
Living people
Bharatiya Janata Party politicians from Bihar
Rashtriya Janata Dal politicians